A. M. R. Ramesh is an Indian film director and producer who has directed several Kannada.films.

The director rose to fame upon his second venture Cyanide. In 2013, he was in media attention regarding his latest biopic on forest dacoit Veerappan.

Personal details 

A. M. R. Ramesh was born in Bangalore, Karnataka, India.

Filmography

References 

Living people
Kannada film directors
Tamil film directors
21st-century Indian film directors
Film directors from Bangalore
1969 births